Herman Hupfeld (February 1, 1894June 8, 1951) was an American songwriter whose most notable composition was "As Time Goes By". He wrote both the lyrics and music.

Life and career
Hupfeld was born in Montclair, New Jersey, the son of Fredericka (Rader), a church organist, and Charles Ludwig Hupfeld. He was sent to study violin in Germany at age 9. Returning to the United States, he graduated from Montclair High School in 1915 and enlisted in the Navy during World War I. When the war ended, he launched a songwriting career. He entertained camps and hospitals during World War II.

Hupfeld never wrote a whole Broadway score, but he became known as a composer who could write a song to fit a specific scene within a Broadway show. Besides As Time Goes By, his best-known songs include Sing Something Simple, Let's Put Out the Lights (and Go to Sleep), When Yuba Plays the Rumba on the Tuba, I've Gotta Get Up and Go to Work, Are You Making Any Money?, Savage Serenade, Down the Old Back Road, A Hut in Hoboken, Night Owl, Honey Ma Love, Baby's Blue, Untitled and The Calinda. While not known as a public performer, he is featured on a 78 rpm gramophone record with Victor Young & his Orchestra, recorded on January 22, 1932, singing and playing piano on two of his compositions, "Goopy Geer (he plays piano and he plays by ear)" and "Down the Old Back Road".

Hupfeld never married and lived with his mother in Montclair until his death by a stroke in 1951 at the age of 57. He was buried at Mount Hebron Cemetery in Montclair. His mother died six years later aged 90. While Hupfeld was alive, their house was often visited by people from the world of entertainment, including Bing Crosby and Mae West. Crosby recorded As Time Goes By in 1943.

"As Time Goes By"
"As Time Goes By" is most famous from the film Casablanca (1942). It was originally written for the Broadway show Everybody's Welcome (1931), which ran for 139 performances. In 1931, the song was a modest hit, with versions issued on Victor, Columbia, Brunswick and the dime store labels.

The song was featured in the unproduced play Everybody Comes To Rick's, which was the basis for the Casablanca story and script. Against Max Steiner's wishes (he wrote the music for the film), it was decided to feature the 1931 song in the 1942 film. It has been well documented that the producers considered dropping the song in post-production, but since Ingrid Bergman had been given the part of Maria in Paramount's For Whom the Bell Tolls and had cut her hair for the part, it would not have been possible to reshoot any of her scenes with the song being performed, or to have her request that Sam (Dooley Wilson) play a different song.

References

External links
 

1894 births
1951 deaths
20th-century American composers
Burials at Mount Hebron Cemetery (Montclair, New Jersey)
People from Montclair, New Jersey
Songwriters from New Jersey